María del Carmen Romero Molina (born 1 August 1985) is a Spanish professional boxer who has held the European female super-bantamweight title since 2020.

Personal life
Born in Puerto Lumbreras on 1 August 1985, Romero has been involved in combat sports from an early age, practicing Kung Fu, kickboxing, and Muay Thai before entering a boxing ring in her early 20s. A mother of two boys, Romero works as a security guard and teaches combat sports to children.

Professional career
Romero suffered defeat in her professional debut, losing via six-round unanimous decision (UD) to Melania Sorroche on 22 November 2015, at the Pavelló d'Esports El Pujolet in Manresa, Spain.

After compiling a record of 3–2 (0 KOs), she defeated Jessica Sanchez via UD on 15 June 2019, capturing the vacant Spanish female super-bantamweight title at the Plaza Adolfo Suárez in Alcantarilla, Spain.

Two fights later she faced Ivanka Ivanova for the vacant European female super-bantamweight title on 18 January 2020, at the Centro Multiusos El Esparragal in Puerto Lumbreras. After the ten-round contest was complete, Romero was declared the winner via UD with all three judges scoring the bout 100–90.

Professional boxing record

References

External links

Living people
1985 births
Sportspeople from the Region of Murcia
Spanish women boxers
Super-bantamweight boxers
European Boxing Union champions
People from Puerto Lumbreras